The African Human Rights Law Journal publishes peer-reviewed contributions dealing with human rights related topics of relevance to Africa, Africans, and scholars of Africa. The journal appears twice a year, in March and October.

Indexing 
The journal is indexed in the International Bibliography of the Social Sciences                        (IBBS).

See also
 Open access in South Africa

South African law journals
African studies
Human rights journals
Delayed open access journals